is an athletic stadium in Saiki, Oita, Japan.

It was one of the home stadium of football club Oita Trinita from 1999 to 2000.

References

External links
Official site

Sports venues in Ōita Prefecture
Football venues in Japan
Athletics (track and field) venues in Japan
Oita Trinita
Verspah Oita